Joel Mustonen (born September 18, 1992) is a Finnish professional ice hockey player who is currently playing for IF Björklöven in the HockeyAllsvenskan (Allsv).

Playing career
Mustonen played as a youth in Sweden and made his professional debut with Skellefteå AIK in the Elitserien in the 2010–11 season. On March 25, 2015, after two seasons in his native Finland with Lahti Pelicans of the Liiga, Mustonen agreed to a two-year contract to return to the SHL with Örebro HK.

Awards and honours

References

External links

1992 births
Living people
IF Björklöven players
Finnish ice hockey centres
Frölunda HC players
Lahti Pelicans players
Örebro HK players
Skellefteå AIK players
Sportspeople from Oulu
Timrå IK players
VIK Västerås HK players